The Kingdom of Saloum (Serer language: Saluum or Saalum) was a Serer/Wolof kingdom in present-day Senegal. Its kings may have been of Mandinka/Kaabu origin. The capital of Saloum was the city of Kahone. It was a sister kingdom of Sine.  Their history, geography and culture were intricately linked and it was common to refer to them as the Sine-Saloum.

History

 

Saloum, just like its sister kingdom (the Kingdom of Sine), is known for its many ancient burial mounds or "tumuli" containing the graves of kings and others. The kingdom has numerous mysterious stone circles whose functions and history were unknown until recently.

Historian Donald R. Wright states that "In the last decade of the fifteenth century, a group of nyancho lineages from Kaabu moved north of the Gambia River and took over an area on the southern edge of the weakening Jolof Empire. From a settlement near the mouth of the Saloum River, these lineages soon mixed with the existing Wolof and Serer population and established the state of Saloum."

According to Abdou Bouri Ba the Kingdom of Saloum was previously known as Mbey (in Serer) and was renamed Saloum by the Maad Saloum Mbegan Ndour in the later part of the 15th century (c. 1494).  For several centuries prior to its renaming, its capital was called Ngap. According to Serer oral tradition, it was named after Saalum Suwareh, a marabout of Maad Saloum Mbegan Ndour (variation: Mbegani Ndour). The tradition went on to say that, Saalum Suwareh agreed to give a juju fetish to Maad Saloum Mbegan Ndour (originally from the Kingdom of Sine) in order to defeat the Toucouleur conqueror and his Muslim marabouts provided he promised to rename the country after him once he is victorious.  Mbegan Ndour agreed. After this oral contract, Mbegan Ndour defeated Ali Elibana and drove his Muslim marabout forces out of Saloum and reign over the country.
Like the Kingdom of Sine, the population is overrun and ruled by the Serer people.  The two are generally referred to as the Serer Kingdoms.  Many parts of present-day Gambia were former colonies of the Kingdom of Saloum. Originally, Saloum extended south to the north banks of the Gambia River. Present-day Gambia was referred to as Lower Saloum. Upper Saloum was where modern day Saloum is in Senegal. Saloum also had control for a time the Kingdom of Baol. 
The States of Sabakh and Sandial were ruled by the Fara Sabakh and Fara Sandial (respective titles of the chiefs), and were both tributary to the king at Kahone (the Maad Saloum). Around 1862, Sambou Oumanneh Touray, a disciple of Maba Diakhou Bâ launched a jihad in Sabakh and Sandial. Having defeated the Fara Sabakh and Fara Sandial, he joined the two countries together (hence : Sabakh-Sandial) and ruled it. The final Fara Sabakh and Fara Sandial died in that jihad. 
During the Serer paternal and Guelowar maternal  dynasties from the 15th century to 1969, nearly 50 kings have been enthroned. The kings continued to hold their court in Kahone, but the city was eclipsed commercially by neighboring Kaolack.

Portuguese explorers in the 15th century referred to Saloum as the kingdom of Borçalo, after 'Bor-ba-Saloum' (Wolof corruption for "King of Saloum" - Maad Saloum).

Although the Kingdom won some major battles against the French, it was later defeated. However, like the Kingdom of Sine, the royal dynasty survived up to 1969, when the last king of Saloum, Fode N'Gouye Joof had died. His year of death corresponded with the death of Maad a Sinig Mahecor Joof, who was king of Sine. These two kings were the last Serer kings and the last kings of the Senegambia. After their deaths, both Kingdoms were incorporated into the new Republic of independent Senegal which gained its independence in 1960. Thus the Kingdom of Sine and the Kingdom of Saloum were the last pre-colonial kingdoms of Senegambia to have survived up to the 20th century.

People and language
Ethnically, Saloum was Serer, but gradually the Wolof immigrants have settled in along with the Fulas, Mandinkas, etc. Unlike the Kingdom of Sine which is ethnically Serer and deeply rooted in "Serer-conservatism", such as the preservation of Serer religion, culture, traditions, etc., Saloum is more cosmopolitan and multi-religious. This explains why some Serer traditionalists who adhere to the tenets of Serer religion are reluctant to afford it the same religious status afforded to Sine as one of the sacred Serer holy sites, in spite of housing many of the Serer sites (see Serer ancient history). Although very cosmopolitan, it is also ethnically Serer, the other ethnic groups are migrants. The Serer language and Wolof are both widely spoken in Saloum. The Cangin languages are also spoken.

Commerce and geography 
Saloum includes flat, swampy tideland areas inland from the Saloum River delta.  In recent years large areas of mangrove growth have been destroyed.  There was a flourishing industry of salt-manufacture at the salt flats along the delta.  Its economic base was groundnut trade, exporting large quantities of nuts to Europe.

Notes

References 

Almada, André Alvares (1594) Tratado breve dos Rios de Guiné do Cabo-Verde: desde o Rio do Sanagá até aos baixos de Sant' Anna 1841 edition, Porto: Typographia Commercial Portuense. online
 Ba, Abdou Bouri. "Essai sur l’histoire du Saloum et du Rip"(avant-propos par Charles Becker and Victor Martin), Bulletin de l'IFAN, vol. 38, série B, number 4, October 1976.
 Becker, Charles. Vestiges historiques, trémoins matériels du passé clans les pays sereer. Dakar. 1993. CNRS - ORS TO M.
Clark, Andrew F. and Lucie Colvin Phillips, Historical Dictionary of Senegal, Second Edition Published as No. 65 of African Historical Dictionaries, (Metuchen, New Jersey: The Scarecrow Press, 1994) p. 246-247
 Diange, Pathé. "Les Royaumes Sérères". Présence Africaines. No. 54 (1965). pp. 142–172.
Diouf, Niokhobaye, "Chronique du royaume du Sine", Suivie de notes sur les traditions orales et les sources écrites concernant le royaume du Sine par Charles Becker et Victor Martin. (1972). Bulletin de l'Ifan, Tome 34, Série B, n° 4, (1972), p 707 (p 5)
 Klein, Martin A. Islam and Imperialism in Senegal Sine-Saloum, 1847–1914. Edinburgh University Press (1968).
Teixera da Mota, Avelino (1946) "A descoberta da Guiné", Boletim cultural da Guiné Portuguesa, P. 1 in Vol. 1, No. 1 (Jan), p. 11-68.
 Sarr, Alioune. "Histoire du Sine-Saloum", Introduction, bibliographie et Notes par Charles Becker. BIFAN. vol. 46, Serie B, number 3–4, 1986–1987.
 Gravrand, Henry. "La civilisation sereer, I. Coosan". Dakar, Nouvelles Editions Africaines (1983).

Countries in medieval Africa
History of Senegal
Kingdoms of Senegal
Countries in precolonial Africa
Serer history
Serer country
Serer precolonial kingdoms
Sahelian kingdoms
States and territories established in 1494
States and territories disestablished in 1969
Precolonial kingdoms of the Gambia